The Presbyterian Church of Nigeria is a Presbyterian church in the Nigeria and subscribes to the Westminster Confession of Faith.

The denomination has ten synods, more than 50 presbyteries and over 4,000 congregations, and almost 8,000 ministers and 5,806 690 members across the country.

History 
The Presbyterian Church of Nigeria was founded by United Presbyterian Church of Scotland missionaries led by the Rev. Hope Masterson Waddell on the invitation of King Eyo Honesty II and King Eyamba V. The missionaries arrived in Calabar and founded the first Presbyterian church at Creek Town on 10th April 1846. From Calabar the church begun to grow. In 1858 the Presbytery of Biafra was formed. The Synod of Biafra formed in 1921.  The church developed rapidly, when the Presbyterian Church of Biafra was established, with the Synod as the highest court. The church become independent. The Presbyterian Church of Biafra became the Presbyterian Church in East Nigeria in 1952. On 16 June 1960, the Presbyterian Church of Nigeria was born.  In 1987, the General Assembly was constituted with two Synods.

The Presbyterian Church in Nigeria began to establish a university in 1993, which was later named Hope Waddell University. Though the operational license has been secured, The university located in Okigwe Ohafia in Abia State is yet to take off.  Its motto is "Excellence, Integrity, and Service".  The church also runs two degree awarding theological institutions, the Hugh Goldie Lay Theological Training Institution Arochukwu in Abia State founded in 1918, and the Essien Ukpabio Presbyterian Theological College, Itu Akwa Ibom State founded in 1994 (an affiliate of the University of Calabar).

The church secretariat is in Ogbor Hill in Abia State in Southeast Nigeria. While the treasury and prelate's office is in Hope Waddell Training Institution Calabar Cross River State  in Southern Nigeria

Structure and missions 
The church has outreaches across the entire country.  It has a Mission Presbytery in the Republics of Benin and Togo.
The church structure are the Session, Presbytery, Synod, General Assembly. The parishes have one to nine congregations, depending on the size. The congregations are ruled by elders. Several churches belong to a regional Presbytery. Presbyteries belong to a bigger body - the Synod. The General Assembly is the Supreme Court of the Church. It is the result of a Scottish Mission. It cooperates with the Church of Scotland.
Synods are:
Synod of Akwa
Synod of Calabar
Synod of The East
Synod of East Central
Synod of Mid East
Synod of Niger Delta
Synod of the North
Synod of South Central
Synod of Upper Cross River
Synod of The West

Theology 
Apostles Creed
Athanasian Creed
Nicene Creed
Heidelberg Catechism
Second Helvetic Confession
Westminster Confession of Faith

Interchurch organisations 
It is a member of the World Council of Churches, the All Africa Conference of Churches, the Christian Council of Nigeria, the World Communion of Reformed Churches, the ARCA and the Reformed Ecumenical Council and the Reformed Ecumenial Council of Nigeria as of 2006. It has been founded in the 
19th century. It has female ministers for decades. The secretariat is in Aba, Nigeria while the office of the Prelate and Moderator of the General Assembly is in Calabar. The current Prelate and Moderator of the General Assembly of The Presbyterian Church of Nigeria is His Eminence Most Rev. Ekpenyong Nyong Akpanika (PhD).

References

External links 
 Website of the Presbyterian Church of Nigeria
 Lagos Presbyterian Church in Lagos, Nigeria

Presbyterianism in Nigeria
Presbyterian denominations in Africa
Members of the World Communion of Reformed Churches
Members of the World Council of Churches
All Africa Conference of Churches